The pygmy jawfish (Anoptoplacus pygmaeus) is a species of ray-finned fish from the family Opistognathidae, the jawfishes. As the name suggests, the pygmy jawfish is a very small species and many of its meristic characters are reduced compared to other jawfishes.

References

Opistognathidae
Fish described in 2017
Taxa named by William Farr Smith-Vaniz